The 2019 Notre Dame Fighting Irish men's soccer team represented University of Notre Dame during the 2019 NCAA Division I men's soccer season. It was the program's 42nd season. It was the program's 7th season competing in the Atlantic Coast Conference.  The Fighting Irish were be led by head coach Chad Riley, in his second year.

Background

The 2018 Notre Dame men's soccer team finished the season with an 11–7–3 overall record and a 4–3–1 ACC record.  The Fighting Irish were seeded fifth–overall in the 2018 ACC Men's Soccer Tournament, where they lost to eventual champions Louisville in the quarterfinals.  The Fighting Irish earned an at-large bid into the 2018 NCAA Division I Men's Soccer Tournament for the sixth season in a row.  As the seventh–overall seed in the tournament, Notre Dame defeated Michigan and ACC foe Virginia before falling to Indiana in the quarterfinals.

At the end of the season, one Fighting Irish soccer player was selected in the 2019 MLS SuperDraft: Tommy McCabe.

Player movement

Players leaving

Players arriving

Squad

Roster

Updated August 20, 2019

Team management

Source:

Schedule
Source 

|-
!colspan=6 style=";"| Exhibition
|-

|-
!colspan=6 style=""| Regular Season

|-
!colspan=6 style=";"| ACC Tournament

|-
!colspan=6 style=";"| NCAA Tournament

Awards and honors

2020 MLS Super Draft

Source:

Rankings

References

2019
Notre Dame Fighting Irish
Notre Dame Fighting Irish
Notre Dame Fighting Irish men's soccer
Notre Dame Fighting Irish